Morinda citrifolia is a fruit-bearing tree in the coffee family, Rubiaceae. Its native range extends across Southeast Asia and Australasia, and was spread across the Pacific by Polynesian sailors. The species is now cultivated throughout the tropics and widely naturalized. Among some 100 names for the fruit across different regions are the more common English names of great morinda, Indian mulberry, noni, beach mulberry, vomit fruit and cheese fruit.

The fresh fruit's strong, vomit-like odor has made it a famine food in most regions, but it remains a staple food among some cultures, and has been used in traditional medicine. In the consumer market, it has been introduced as a supplement in various formats, such as capsules, skin products, and juices.

Growing habitats
Morinda citrifolia grows in shady forests, as well as on open rocky or sandy shores. It is tolerant of saline soils, drought conditions, and secondary soils. It is therefore found in a wide variety of habitats: volcanic terrains, lava-strewn coasts, and clearings or limestone outcrops, as well as in coralline atolls.

The plant bears flowers and fruits all year round. The fruit is a multiple fruit that has a pungent odor when ripening, and is hence also known as "cheese fruit" or even "vomit fruit". It is oval in shape and reaches  size. At first green, the fruit turns yellow then almost white as it ripens. It contains many seeds.

Morinda citrifolia is especially attractive to weaver ants, which make nests from the leaves of the tree. These ants protect the plant from some plant-parasitic insects.  The smell of the fruit also attracts fruit bats, which aid in dispersing the seeds. A type of fruit fly, Drosophila sechellia, feeds exclusively on these fruits.

Uses
A variety of beverages (juice drinks), powders (from dried ripe or unripe fruits), cosmetic products (lotions, soaps), oil (from seeds), leaf powders (for encapsulation or pills) have been introduced into the consumer market.

Food
Noni is sometimes called a "starvation fruit", implying that it was used by indigenous peoples as emergency food during times of famine. Despite its strong smell and bitter taste, the fruit was nevertheless eaten as a famine food, and, in some Pacific Islands, even as a staple food, either raw or cooked. Southeast Asians and Australian Aboriginals consume the fruit raw with salt or cook it with curry. The seeds are edible when roasted. In Thai cuisine, the leaves (known as bai-yo) are used as a green vegetable and are the main ingredient of kaeng bai-yo, cooked with coconut milk. The fruit (luk-yo) is added as a salad ingredient to some versions of somtam.

Traditional medicine
Green fruit, leaves, and root or rhizomes might have been used in Polynesian cultures as a general tonic, in addition to its traditional place in Polynesian culture as a famine food. Although Morinda is considered to have biological properties in traditional medicine, there is no confirmed evidence of clinical efficacy for any intended use. In 2018, a Hawaiian manufacturer of noni food and skincare products was issued an FDA warning letter for marketing unapproved drugs and making false health claims in violation of the US Food, Drug and Cosmetic Act.

Dyes
Among Austronesian peoples, noni was traditionally used primarily for the production of dyes. It was carried into the Pacific Islands as canoe plants by Austronesian voyagers. Morinda bark produces a brownish-purplish dye that may be used for making batik. In Hawaii, yellowish dye is extracted from its roots to dye cloth. The use of Morinda citrifolia as a fabric dye requires the use of a mordant on the fabric, prior to accepting the dye, and which, in the case of the Morinda dye, is labor intensive if the aim is to receive rich shades and hues.

Popular culture
The fruit is widely used in eating challenges in the British reality television programme I'm a Celebrity...Get Me Out of Here!, where it is referred to as "vomit fruit".

Nutrients and phytochemicals
Morinda citrifolia fruit powder contains carbohydrates and dietary fibre in moderate amounts. These macronutrients evidently reside in the fruit pulp, as M. citrifolia juice has sparse nutrient content. The main micronutrients of M. citrifolia pulp powder include vitamin C, niacin (vitamin B3), iron and potassium. Vitamin A, calcium and sodium are present in moderate amounts. When M. citrifolia juice alone is analyzed and compared to pulp powder, only vitamin C is retained in an amount (34 mg per 100 gram juice) that is 64% of the content of a raw navel orange (53 mg per 100 g or 89% of the Daily Value). Sodium levels in M. citrifolia juice (about 3% of Dietary Reference Intake, DRI) are high compared to an orange, and potassium content is moderate.

Morinda citrifolia fruit contains a number of phytochemicals, including lignans, oligo- and polysaccharides, flavonoids, iridoids, fatty acids, scopoletin, catechin, beta-sitosterol, damnacanthal, and alkaloids. Although these substances have been studied for bioactivity, research is insufficient to conclude anything about their effects on human health.

Gallery

See also
Noni juice

References

External links

Asian vegetables
citrifolia
Plant dyes
Tropical fruit
Flora of tropical Asia
Flora of Australia
Bushfood
Plants described in 1753
Taxa named by Carl Linnaeus
Edible fruits